The 2016 Cork Junior Hurling Championship was the 119th staging of the Cork Junior Hurling Championship since its establishment by the Cork County Board in 1895. The championship began on 10 September 2016 and ended on 15 October 2016.

On 15 October 2016, Mayfield won the championship following a 1-16 to 1-13 defeat of Sarsfields in the final. This was their second championship title in the grade and their first since 1978.

Sarsfields' Aaron Myers was the championship's top scorer with 0-26.

Qualification

Results

Quarter-finals

Semi-finals

Final

References

External links
 2016 JAHC results

Cork Junior Hurling Championship
Cork Junior Hurling Championship